Precious Ones is the third studio album released by Gary Hughes in 1998.

Track listing 
All songs written by Gary Hughes.

 "In Your Eyes" – 5:43
 "Don't Ever Say Goodbye" – 6:07
 "The Colours of My Life" – 5:05
 "Give My Love a Try" – 5:36
 "Divided We Fall" – 3:44
 "The Night the Love Died" – 6:03
 "First Light" (Instrumental) – 0:58
 "Wrecking Machine" – 5:27
 "Perfect Ten" – 4:34
 "This Time" – 4:56
 "Heart of a Woman" – 5:24
 "Precious Ones" – 4:16

Personnel 
Gary Hughes – vocals, guitars, keyboards and Bass guitars
Vinny Burns – guitars
Greg Morgan – drums
Andy Thompson – keyboards
Ralph Santolla – guitars
Aziz Ibrahim – guitars
Jason Thanos – backing vocals
Todd Plant – backing vocals
Mark Ashton – backing vocals
Ray Brophy – backing vocals

Production 
Mixing – Ray Brophy
Engineer – Ray Brophy
Additional Engineering – Neil Amison and Tim

External links 
Heavy Harmonies page

Gary Hughes albums
1998 albums
Albums produced by Gary Hughes
Frontiers Records albums